In linguistics, a chronolect or temporal dialect is a specific speech variety whose characteristics are in particular determined by time-related factors. As such, it can be contrasted with a sociolect, an ethnolect or a geolect. In historical linguistics, a chronolect is set more or less equal to a specific language stage. Many chronolects are extinct or endangered.

See also
Historical language
Classical language
Dialect
Language evolution

References

Language varieties and styles
Historical linguistics
Linguistics terminology